Peter M. Ibbotson is a philatelist who, in 1991, was awarded the Crawford Medal by the Royal Philatelic Society London for his The postal history and stamps of Mauritius.

Selected publications
The postal history and stamps of Mauritius. London: Royal Philatelic Society, 1991. 
The postal history and stamps of Mauritius. Revised edition. Newbury: Indian Ocean Study Circle, 1995.

References

Philatelists
Year of birth missing (living people)
Philately of Mauritius
Fellows of the Royal Philatelic Society London
Living people